Rebra is a commune in Bistrița-Năsăud County, Transylvania, Romania. It is composed of a single village, Rebra. The river Rebra passes through the commune.

References

Communes in Bistrița-Năsăud County
Localities in Transylvania